Variable Shunt Reactors are used in high voltage energy transmission systems to stabilize the voltage during load variations. A traditional shunt reactor has a fixed rating and is either connected to the power line all the time or switched in and out depending on the load. Recently  Variable Shunt Reactors (VSR) have been developed and introduced on the market. The rating of a VSR can be changed in steps, The maximum regulation range are depending on the capability of the on-load tap changer used in combination with the regulation winding used for the shunt reactor, the maximum regulation range has increased over the years, from 50%, now up to 80% at some voltage levels

The variability brings several benefits compared to a traditional fixed shunt reactors. The VSR can continuously compensate reactive power as the load varies and thereby securing voltage stability. Other important benefits are:
 reduced voltage jumps resulting from switching in and out of traditional fixed shunt reactors
 flexibility for future (today unknown) load and generation patterns
 improved interaction with other transmission equipment and/or systems such as coarse tuning of SVC equipment
 limiting the foot print of a substation if parallel fixed shunt reactors can be replaced with one VSR
 a VSR can be used as a flexible spare unit and be moved to other locations in the power grid if needed
 mitigation of zero-miss phenomenon, while energisation of long power lines and cables

VSRs are considered as technically advanced products and are mainly supplied by larger global manufacturers.

References

External links
 http://www05.abb.com/global/scot/scot252.nsf/veritydisplay/dadf3c1d27681cc48525775400608bb5/$file/1zse954001-21_vsr_pamphlet.pdf
 http://www.getra.it/default.php?mcat=azi&cod=casehistory&scod=casepower&id=320
 http://www.swedishneutral.se/main.php?name=shunt_reactor

Electric power transmission